Florence Balgarnie  (19 August 1856 – 25 March 1928) was a British suffragette, speaker, pacifist, feminist, and temperance activist. Characterised as a "staunch Liberal", and influenced by Lydia Becker, Balgarnie began her support of women's suffrage from the age of seventeen.

Early years
Florence Balgarnie was born in Scarborough, North Riding of Yorkshire, England, on 19 August 1856. Her parents were Rev. Robert Balgarnie (1826–1899), a well-known Nonconformist minister of the South Cliff Congregational Church, and his wife, Martha Rooke. The family included two younger sisters, including one named Mary.

Career
Balgarnie was elected to the Scarborough School Board in 1883. It was here that Balgarnie developed her skills as a speaker. In her native town, she aroused high anticipations for her future career. Since coming to London, in 1884, or 1886, temperance was the subject which interested her the most, and the one on which she spoke with the greatest frequency. It was around 1884 that, with some fear, Balgarnie first began public speaking, but it became a source of pleasure. A great temperance meeting at Derby, England during a General Election, found her addressing several thousand people in the open air. It was to her "a crowded hour of glorious life"; and it was characteristic of her power of repartee that a dissident in the crowd who set himself to interrupt Balgarnie's speech became converted to her view.

By 1889, she was the secretary of the Central National Society for Women's Suffrage, but this position was given up for an even more congenial one, that of organising secretary, under Lady Henry Somerset, of the British Women's Temperance Association. Balgarnie held this appointment till 1895, and thereafter made time for speaking and writing on behalf of temperance and other causes. Balgarnie was the author of A plea for the appointment of police matrons at police stations (1894).

In 1902, in Washington, D.C., she represented the National Union of Women's Suffrage Societies at the First Conference of the International Woman Suffrage Alliance. She was also affiliated with the International Arbitration & Peace Association, the British Anti-lynching League, and the Society for Promoting the Return of Women as County Councillors, Personal Rights Association, Moral Reform Union, and the Men and Women's Club. She was a co-founder of the executive committee of the People's Suffrage Federation. 

She died in Florence, Italy, 25 March 1928, and was buried at Cimitero degli Allori, in Florence.

Works

References

Citations

Attribution

Bibliography
 
 

1856 births
1928 deaths
People from Scarborough, North Yorkshire
English suffragettes
English pacifists
English feminists
English temperance activists
National Society for Women's Suffrage